State Road 43 (SR 43) is the unsigned state designation for U.S. Route 301 between Palmetto and the Florida State Fairgrounds, just south of Interstate 4. Names of the road include 10th Street West in Manatee County (which includes a portion not signed as any route) and Tampa East Boulevard in Hillsborough County.

A short unsigned County Road 43 continues west from Palmetto towards Emerson Point.

Major intersections

References

External links
Florida Route Log (SR 43)

043
Roads in the Tampa Bay area
043
043
043